Nasaruddin Umar is the founder of the Indonesian interfaith organization Masyarakat Dialog antar Umat Beragama and was vice minister (2011–2014) in the Indonesian Ministry of Religious Affairs. He is also a member of the UK-Indonesia Advisory Team, founded by UK prime minister Tony Blair.

He is the author of 12 books, among them: Argumen Kesetaraan Gender Perspektif Al-Quran (Paramadina, 1999), which examines gender bias in the Quran.

Education

Nasaruddin Umar did his postgraduate studies at IAIN Syarif Hidayatullah Jakarta, resulting is a Magister degree (1992), and a doctorate (1998).

During his doctorate studies, he was a visiting student for a PhD Program at McGill University, Montreal, Canada (1993–1994), and a visiting student for a PhD Program at Leiden University, Netherlands (1994–1995).

After achieving his doctorate, he was a visiting scholar at Sopia University, Tokyo (2001), a visiting scholar at SAOS University of London (2001–2002), and a visiting Scholar at Georgetown University, Washington DC (2003–2004).

References

External links
 

Living people
Year of birth missing (living people)
Indonesian Islamic religious leaders